Kodarma (also spelled as Koderma) is a city and a notified area in the Koderma subdivision of the Koderma district in the Indian state of Jharkhand.

Demographics
As per 2011 Census of India, Kodarma Nagar Parishad had a total population of 24,633 of which 12,941 were males and 11,692 females. Scheduled Castes numbered 1,691 and Scheduled Tribes numbered 153.

 India census, Kodarma had a population of 17,160. Males constitute 53% of the population and females 47%. Kodarma has an average literacy rate of 63%, higher than the national average of 59.5%: male literacy is 71%, and female literacy is 53%. In Kodarma, 17% of the population is under 6 years of age.

Education
There are a number of schools and degree colleges in Kodarma:

Capital University is a private university established in 2018.
Jharkhand Vidhi Mahavidyalaya
Jagannath Jain College
Govt. Polytechnic, Koderma
Grizzly College of Education
Ramgovind Institute of Technology, it is a private polytechnic college
PVSS DAV Public School, Jhumri Telaiya

Hospitals 

Sadar Hospital is the government owned public hospital in the city.

Economy
Koderma Thermal Power Station a coal-based 1000MW power plant of DVC was established in 2012 employing thousands of people.

See also
Kodarma district
Jhumri Telaiya

References

 
Koderma district
Community development blocks in Jharkhand
Community development blocks in Koderma district